Marcello Pignatelli, C.R. (1567–1621) was a Roman Catholic prelate who served as Bishop of Jesi (1617–1621).

Biography
Marcello Pignatelli was born in Rome, Italy in 1567 and ordained a priest in the Congregation of Clerics Regular of the Divine Providence. On 13 November 1617, he was appointed during the papacy of Pope Paul V as Bishop of Jesi. On 26 November 1617, he was consecrated bishop by Ladislao d'Aquino, Bishop of Venafro, with Antonio d'Aquino, Bishop of Sarno, and Innico Siscara, Bishop of Anglona-Tursi, serving as co-consecrators. He served as Bishop of Jesi until his death in 1621.

References

External links and additional sources
 (for Chronology of Bishops) 
 (for Chronology of Bishops) 

17th-century Italian Roman Catholic bishops
Bishops appointed by Pope Paul V
1567 births
1621 deaths
Clergy from Rome
Theatine bishops